Michael Adler (1868–1944) was an English Orthodox rabbi and military chaplain.

Michael Adler may also refer to:

Michael J. Adler, American diplomat and U.S. ambassador to South Sudan
Michael M. Adler, American businessman and U.S. ambassador to Belgium